Frederick Bradley (1908date of death unknown) was an English rower.

Rowing
He competed in the single sculls at the 1930 British Empire Games for England and won a bronze medal.

Personal life
He was listed as having no occupation at the time of the 1930 Games.

References

1908 births
Year of death missing
English male rowers
Commonwealth Games medallists in rowing
Commonwealth Games bronze medallists for England
Rowers at the 1930 British Empire Games
Medallists at the 1930 British Empire Games